Harutiun Svadjian (1831 in Constantinople, Ottoman Turkey – 1874 in Constantinople, Ottoman Turkey), was an Armenian writer, political activist, teacher, and considered one of the founders of Armenian political humorist literature.

Biography 
Svadjian was born in Constantinople in 1831. He lost both his parents at a very young age. After completing his local education, he was sponsored by Khatchadur Bardizbanian to study abroad. Eventually, Svadjian managed to study in Paris at the St. Barbe College. After returning to Constantinople in 1852, he participated in Nahapet Rusinian's intellectual circle. He then became of teacher in the local Beşiktaş Armenian school. Svadjian was also instrumental in the preparation of the Armenian National Constitution (1859) which was ultimately introduced in 1862. He was very active in supporting, encouraging, and liberating Western Armenia from Ottoman Sultanate oppression.

Literary career 
Harutiun Svadjian was one of the prominent writers of the 19th century that preferred to change the classical Armenian Krapar writing standard to a vernacular Ashkharhabar. He started the bimonthly literary journal called Meghu (Bee; published 1856-65, 1879-74) which he used to openly write about oppression, communal regression, Armenian church leaders, and the Ottoman government. It was in Meghu where Svadjian began his political humorist writings. He published the works Aptakk (Slaps) and Ansge Ange (About here and there) which criticized the European involvement in Armenian affairs in a humorous way. Svadjian also a narrative poem entitled Arik Haykazunk which was set into music and became the foundation of the Armenian National Constitution. Among the writings that increased his fame were Katina, a novella, Matnutiun (Betrayel) a political pamphlet, and Arandzar Amatuni a historical tragedy.

In 1981, Soviet Armenia commemorated the 150th anniversary of his birth.

References 

1831 births
1874 deaths
Armenian male novelists
Armenian educators
Armenians from the Ottoman Empire
19th-century writers from the Ottoman Empire
Writers from Istanbul
Armenian satirists
19th-century Armenian novelists
19th-century male writers